Corran is a former fishing village, situated on Corran Point, on the west side of the Corran Narrows of Loch Linnhe,  in Lochaber, Highland, Scotland. There are three small settlements set apart from the main cluster of houses: North Corran, Clovullin and Sallachan. The Highland Council Corran Ferry runs to Corran from eastern shore of the Narrows and the Corran Point Lighthouse is located there.

References

Populated places in Lochaber